Transair-Gyraintiee was a regional charter airline based in Arkhangelsk, Russia and established in 1996. Operations ceased in 2010 when new regulations were enforced.

Fleet

References

External links
 Homepage (archived) 

Defunct airlines of Russia
Airlines established in 1996
Airlines disestablished in 2010
Companies based in Arkhangelsk
Russian companies established in 1996
2010 disestablishments in Russia